Robert Paul McGill (born April 27, 1962) is a Canadian former professional ice hockey player. McGill played in the National Hockey League (NHL) from 1981 until 1994.

Early life
McGill began playing hockey when he moved to Leduc with his family in 1970. He left Leduc to play for the BCJHL’s Abbotsford Flyers in 1978. McGill joined the WHL’s Victoria Cougars from 1979 to 1981, winning the WHL championship in 1981.

Playing career
McGill started his NHL career with the Toronto Maple Leafs in 1981–82 after he was selected 26th overall by the Leafs in the 1980 NHL Entry Draft.

He also played for the Chicago Black Hawks, San Jose Sharks, Detroit Red Wings, New York Islanders, and Hartford Whalers. He retired from the NHL after the 1993–94 season.

Coaching career
McGill has coached in both the American Hockey League, becoming the assistant coach of the AHL’s Hershey Bears from 1996 to 1998, who won the 1997 Calder Cup. He then went on to become the head coach of the Baton Rouge Kingfish from 1998 to 2000 in the East Coast Hockey League.

Broadcasting career
In 2005, McGill has transitioned into a career as an analyst with Leafs Nation Network, a popular media outlet in the Greater Toronto Area following the Toronto Maple Leafs and their AHL affiliate the Toronto Marlies.  McGill also serves as the colour analyst for the Marlies radio broadcasts on AM 640 Toronto.

Personal
In 2018, McGill and his mother Kay McGill, long-time Leduc Minor Hockey Association volunteer and first female president in 1977, both made their way into Leduc’s Sports Hall of Fame.

Career statistics

References

External links
 

1962 births
Living people
Canadian ice hockey defencemen
Canadian radio sportscasters
Canadian television sportscasters
Chicago Blackhawks players
Chicago Wolves (IHL) players
Detroit Red Wings players
Hartford Whalers players
New York Islanders players
St. Catharines Saints players
San Jose Sharks players
Ice hockey people from Edmonton
Springfield Indians players
Toronto Maple Leafs draft picks
Toronto Maple Leafs players
Victoria Cougars (WHL) players